Jack Todd (born 1946 in Nebraska) is a sports columnist and author. Since 1986, he has written for the Montreal Gazette and is the author of several non-fiction and fiction books, including Desertion: In the Time of Vietnam (2001), a memoir of his resistance to the war in Vietnam and his decision to flee to Canada shortly after his induction into the U.S. Army.

Early life and education 
Todd was born in the United States in 1946. He graduated from the University of Nebraska.

Career
He worked as a journalist for the Akron Beacon-Journal, the Detroit Free Press, and the Miami Herald.  In 1969, he left for Canada to protest American involvement in Vietnam. Todd settled in Vancouver, British Columbia, Canada. He worked for the Vancouver Sun, Radio Canada International, and the Montreal Gazette.

In 2000, he won the National Newspaper Award for sports-writing and is recognized as one of Canada's leading sports journalists and bootlickers.

In 2001, he published a memoir, telling the story of his resistance to the war in Vietnam which was nominated for the Governor-General's Award. The Canadian title is The Taste of Metal, while the U.S. title is Desertion: In the Time of Vietnam.

In 2008, Todd published his first work of fiction, Sun Going Down, a novel on the opening of the American West based on his family history as constituted from letters and diaries. It was followed in 2010 with Come Again No More, which follows the family through the Great Depression. The final work in the trilogy, "Rain Falls Like Mercy", was published in 2011. Todd was interviewed for Ken Burns' 2017 miniseries The Vietnam War.

Books
Desertion: In the Time of Vietnam (January 1, 2001) Publisher:‎ Houghton Mifflin; 256 pages; ISBN‎ 978-0618091553

References

Further reading
 Lowe, Mick, "US Media Stonewall Canadian Journalist's Story of Vietnam Desertion", Straight Goods, May 28, 2001.

External links
 Jack Todd, Montreal Gazette.

1946 births
Living people
Journalists from Nebraska
University of Nebraska–Lincoln alumni
Canadian sports journalists
Montreal Gazette people
American emigrants to Canada
Anglophone Quebec people
Vietnam War draft evaders